Radersdorfer Baggersee is a lake in Swabia, Bavaria, Germany. At an elevation of 447 m, its surface area is 5 ha.

Lakes of Bavaria